Michael Nicholas "Iron Mike" Mikulak (December 2, 1912 – June 4, 1999) was an American football fullback who played three seasons in the National Football League.

High school and college career
Born in Minneapolis, Minnesota, Mikulak graduated from Edison High School in 1930. He attended the University of Oregon. Though originally a defensive player, Mikulak became Oregon's starting fullback and helped lead the Ducks to a 4–1 Pacific Coast Conference record in 1933, tying them with Stanford for the conference championship. (Stanford, however, received the bid to the 1934 Rose Bowl due to its victory over USC, the only team to beat the Ducks that year.) Mikulak was a two-time all-Pacific Coast Conference selection, and was a consensus All-American in 1933.

Mikulak earned the nickname "Iron Mike" because he wore an aluminum chest protector to protect a protruding sternum.

NFL career
Mikulak signed with the Chicago Cardinals in 1934. He played three seasons in the NFL, quickly earning a reputation as a bruising fullback, and was named to the All-Pro team in his second season. Following the 1936 season, Mikulak retired from professional football and returned to the University of Oregon to become the backfield coach on his old team, and to complete his degree.

After football
He remained with Oregon until 1941, when he was called to active duty by the United States Army. Mikulak served in the Army for 27 years, including working as the chief of military police in Naples, Italy during World War II. Following his Army career, Mikulak received a masters in educational administration and was director of the University of Iowa's off-campus graduate education department until his retirement in 1978.

Personal and legacy
Mikulak was married with two children. He is a member of the Oregon Sports Hall of Fame and the University of Oregon Athletic Hall of Fame. He died in Woodland, California in 1999.

References

Chicago Cardinals players
1912 births
1999 deaths
Oregon Ducks football players
Oregon Ducks football coaches
Players of American football from Minneapolis
Sports coaches from Minneapolis
Edison High School (Minnesota) alumni
United States Army personnel of World War II
American military police officers